"A Writer's Prayer" is an English poem by the Indian poet and renowned spiritual healer Tarun Cherian. Cherian has had written many a poems beforehand with this one being his best work. A Writers Prayer won Second Prize in the Fifth All India Poetry Competition conducted by The Poetry Society (India) in 1993. The poem was his first major award-winning work. This poem was written by him in tribute to his wife Celia Cherian. Tarun eventually went on to make a mark in mysticism, spirituality and visual art.

Excerpts from the Poem 
Let my words have an unvarnished feel to them. Truth writ in the grain. Sentences that feel like bark and offer comfort like a bench after a long walk into the hills with a woman.

*******

Let my words have the clearness of a stream - the seeing pebbles look. The kind through which you reach and pick a water smooth pebble. Or better still cupped in both hands, its icy coolness splashed on a sweaty face and arms dewed with a laughing run up a summery slope.

********

Let my words sound like a lullaby, rocking my child in its syllables rippling like gentle waves in an ocean with no shores.

Structure of the poem
The poem has a unique and original structure, which marks a departure from contemporary Indian poetry. Its five lines can be regarded as five stanzas or five paragraphs. The diction is that of prose, but the strong evocative imagery belongs to poetry of the highest quality. The five stanzas evoke images pertaining to five different sense organs – sight, smell, touch, hearing and smell. The poem can be thought of a bouquet of meditations on different paths to Truth.

Comments and criticism
The poem has received positive reviews since its first publication in 1994 in the book Voices of the Future. The poem has been frequently quoted in scholarly analysis of contemporary Indian English poetry.

See also
The Poetry Society (India)
 Tarun Cherian

Notes

External links
  Fifth National Poetry Competition 1988 – Award Winners
Poems by Tarun Cherian
  India Writes – Contemporary Indian Poetry
A Writer's Prayer – the full text
  Tarun Cherian's Writings
Biography of Tarun Cherian
"Best Indian Poems"

Indian poems